was the pen name of Shigeta Sadakazu (重田 貞一), a Japanese writer active during the late Edo period of Japan. He was among the most prolific  writers of the late Edo period — between 1795 and 1801 he wrote a minimum of twenty novels a year. He mainly wrote ,  and over 360 illustrated stories, (合巻 ). He also helped create kokkeibon as a genre. Ikku was one of the most prolific writers of his time, and shaped the literary history that came after him.

Life
Jippensha Ikuu was born in 1765 in the Suruga Province. Ikku's life story is hard to define, because most of what we know about him comes from his own literary works, and hearsay from his peers. What we do know about his actual upbringing is: that he was born into the high-middle class, his father being a samurai for the magistrate of Fuchu. He lived and worked in Suruga for the daimyo until he was fired. He also worked in Osaka briefly until he was fired again. After this, he decided to follow his two passions in life: incense burning and plays, which took him all around Japan. He transitioned from plays to literature, specifically Sharebon, and began producing them prolifically. Most of his literature was influence by his travels around Japan. We do get a bit of insight into Ikku's life through his literature, but most of what we get from Ikku himself is ironic writing about himself and his process. Jippensha kesaku no tanehon is a story about Ikku's alter ego, and how its hard for him to come up with good plot in his stories (the direct translation meaning "Jippensha’s sourcebook for frivolous fiction"). These stories help us see into his writing process, and a little bit into his life, but everything he wrote about himself must be taken with a grain of salt, due to his enjoyment of embellishment and irony. The following anecdotes are told about him (most likely by him). He accepted poverty with good humor and, having no furniture, hung his bare walls with paintings of the furniture he might have had. On holidays he sacrificed to the gods with pictures of excellent offerings. Being presented with a bathtub in the common interest, he carried it home inverted on his head, and overthrew with ready wit the pedestrians who fell his way. When his publisher came to see him, Jippensha invited him to take a bath. While his invitation was being accepted he decked himself in the publisher's clothes and paid his New Year's Day calls in proper ceremonial costume. Although Ikku is often painted to be this charismatic welcoming person, these anecdotes are now widely regarded as apocryphal.

Death 
In 1831, Jippensha became paralyzed. On his deathbed, Jippensha is said to have enjoined his pupils to place upon his corpse, before his cremation, certain packets which he solemnly entrusted to them. He died on August 7 of that year. At his funeral, prayers having been said, the pyre was lighted, whereupon it turned out that the packets were full of firecrackers, which exploded merrily. Jippensha had kept his youthful promise that his life would be full of surprises, even after his death. As is common when dealing with stories about Ikku, this tale is most likely not true.

His ashes were buried in Asakusa in Tokyo at the Zenryu temple. This fact needs verification as his grave is marked on Japanese maps as being located in Kachidoki, Chuo-ku, Tokyo at 35°39'25.6"N 139°46'29.1"E.

Career 
Ikku is commonly connected with comic storytelling, often only thought of as a comic writer. Matthew Shores explains that way of thinking about Ikku was oversimplifying his life. Ikku was not just connected to comic storytelling, but forged his own fame, by expanding outside of just writing and illustrating, into storytelling and the social aspect of literature popularity. Despite all this talent for writing, illustrating, and drama, he was also known for his storytelling. He was not just the man behind the books, but also the face of them. Ikku was the life of the party, reading his books aloud, and just generally being a really nice person.

One of the most impressive facts about Ikku was his talent for not only writing, but also drawing. Ikku illustrated most of the books that he wrote, making him a goldmine for publishers. He offered them a deal, since they did not have to pay two different people to write and illustrate, they could pay Ikku more than one person would be paid, but less than two. This led to an exceptional amount of his work being published, not only for its quality, but also its lower cost. Ikku's success as a comic writer was dependent on his knowledge of current events, and his talent for parodying them in his comics. The travel boom in Japan that occurred in the early 1900s inspired him to write his famous "fictional guide books" or Hizakurige. This had to be done gracefully however, due to the strict censorship laws. Despite how prolifically Ikku was published, he was not simply a profit machine for his publishers, but occasionally proved to be a money drain. Ikku had a habit of being slightly too controversial in his writing. The technique of Ugachi or "hole poking" had to be done gracefully, or censors would come and arrest you. Ikku was not subtle enough, and was put on a fifty-day house arrest for his inappropriate writing, his publishers were also fined heavily and had their woodblocks destroyed. His masterpiece, Tōkaidōchū Hizakurige, was published in twelve parts between 1802 and 1822. Aston calls it "the most humorous and entertaining book in the Japanese language." Tōkaidōchū Hizakurige is a series of comedic stories about two men on the road from Edo, and is one of the first kokkeibon. This is a common theme in most of his stories, due to his experience in travel, and the popularity of travel at the time.

Story Telling Clubs 
Along with being an incredibly charismatic narrator of his own stories at public parties, he also participated in a more professional version of this practice, at story telling clubs. At these clubs, many writers would get together to eat, drink, and perform little skits and plays. His club was called Eiyūdō hanashi no kai (Eiyūdō comic story parties, Eiyūdō being the publishing house). The main purpose was to get drunk and have fun, but it also had a secondary benefit of generating ideas for literature. While this might seem inconsequential, it was actually incredibly important to the literary history of Japan. Many works of Kokkeibon , and Kokkeibon as an entire genre would not have been possible without the inspiration of these comic storytelling parties.

Works
Hizakurige or Shank's Mare: Japan's Great Comic Novel of Travel and Ribaldry by Ikku Jippensha.  Translated by Thomas Satchell.  Rutland, Vermont: Charles E. Tuttle Company.  1960.  

Dōchū hizakurige 
Tokaidochu Hizakurige: Travels on the Eastern Seaboard

References

Further reading

1765 births
1831 deaths
Japanese writers of the Edo period